Sam Bass Warner Jr. (April 6, 1928 – January 22, 2023) was an American historian and author. He taught at M.I.T., Washington University in St. Louis, the University of Michigan, Boston University, and Brandeis University.

Early life and death
Warner was born in Boston, Massachusetts, on April 6, 1928, and died in Needham, Massachusetts, on January 22, 2023, at the age of 94.

Books
Province of Reason
Streetcar Suburbs: The Process of Growth in Boston, 1870-1900
with Stephen Spongberg A Reunion of Trees: The Discovery of Exotic Plants and Their Introduction Into North American and European Landscapes (Harvard University Press, 1998)
The Private City: Philadelphia in Three Periods of Its Growth (University of Pennsylvania Press)
Urban Wilderness: A History of the American City
To Dwell Is to Garden: A History of Boston's Community Gardens (Northeastern University Press, 1987)
Greater Boston: Adapting Regional Traditions to the Present

References 

1928 births
2023 deaths
American historians
American writers
Writers from Boston
Massachusetts Institute of Technology faculty
Washington University in St. Louis faculty
University of Michigan faculty
Brandeis University faculty